The Bankipur Central Jail was a colonial prison located in Patna in the state of Bihar, India. Many notable dissidents such as Rajendra Prasad, Brajkishore Prasad, Srikrishna Sinha, Anugrah Narayan Sinha, Mulana Mazharul Haque and J. B. Kripalani, among others, were imprisoned here during the struggle for India's independence.

The Central Jail was shifted from Bankipur to Beur in early 1960s by the then chief minister of Bihar, Pandit Binodanand Jha. Later, the prison was demolished and a Buddha Park were constructed in the same area.

See also

Beur Central Jail
List of prisons in India

References

British colonial prisons in Asia
Defunct prisons in India
History of Patna
British India
Indian independence movement in Bihar
Demolished buildings and structures in India